PocketRock is a 2001 (released in 2003 in the US) album by the German punk rock band Donots.

Track listing
"I Quit"	
"Whatever Happened to the 80s"	
"Superhero"
"Today"
"Don't You Know"
"Room with a View"
"Watch You Fall"
"In Too Deep"
"Radio Days"
"Hot Rod"
"Jaded"
"At 23"
"Backstabbing" (bonus track)
"Hey Kids" (Internet bonus track)

External links

2003 albums
Donots albums
GUN Records albums